Appendix, or its plural form appendices, may refer to:


In documents
 Addendum, an addition made to a document by its author after its initial printing or publication
 Bibliography, a systematic list of books and other works
 Index (publishing), a list of words or phrases with pointers to where related material can be found in a document

Anatomy
 Appendix (anatomy), a part of the human digestive system

Arts and media
 Appendix (band), a Finnish punk rock group
 The Appendix, a quarterly journal of history and culture